Kate & Allie is an American sitcom television series that aired on CBS from March 19, 1984 to May 22, 1989, starring Susan Saint James and Jane Curtin as two divorced women, both with children, who decide to live together in the same house. The series was created by Sherry Coben.

Overview
The show stars Susan Saint James as the free-spirited Kate McArdle and Jane Curtin as her more traditional childhood friend, Allie Lowell. The two decide to share a brownstone in New York City's Greenwich Village after their divorces, and raise their families together.

The show also starred Ari Meyers as Kate's daughter Emma, and Frederick Koehler and Allison Smith as Allie's children Chip and Jennie.

Both Kate and Allie dated men regularly, but were portrayed as strong, independent women, which was still a relative novelty on television at the time. Unlike other successful career women portrayed before them, Kate and Allie were shown to be wise to the games men play, but not averse to remarrying if the opportunity presented itself.

Kate & Allie first aired on CBS as a midseason replacement series and only six episodes were initially commissioned, but the favorable response from critics and viewers alike (its first episode ranked #4 out of all the television shows airing that week) easily persuaded CBS to commit to a full season in the fall of 1984. The show was one of the most popular and critically acclaimed sitcoms of the 1980s, consistently ranking in the Top 20 shows until its final season. Curtin won two Emmy Awards for Best Actress in a Comedy Series, while Saint James was nominated in the same category three times.

Curtin and Saint James had previously worked together in the 1980 movie How to Beat the High Cost of Living.

At the beginning of the series, Kate worked as a travel agent, while Allie stayed home and took care of the domestic duties while also pursuing her college degree she abandoned when she married her first husband. Kate's storylines often revolved around her struggles to be taken seriously in the workplace, while Allie's often revolved around learning to be more independent and sure of herself after her years as a housewife. In the show's fifth season, Kate quit her job and teamed up with Allie to start their own catering service.

In the show's second-to-last season, Allie dated Bob Barsky (Sam Freed), a television sportscaster who proposed to Allie in the season finale. Following their marriage, Allie and Bob moved into a new apartment in the show's final season. Bob, however, took a job which involved regular travel, and Kate moved into the new apartment as well. This plot development, frequently cited as one of the canonical examples of a television show jumping the shark, led viewers to lose interest,<ref name="mbc">[http://www.museum.tv/eotv/kateandalli.htm Kate and Allie] from the website of the Museum of Broadcast Communications</ref> and CBS chose not to renew Kate & Allie for a seventh season.

Episodes

Cast and characters

Main cast
 Susan Saint James as Katherine "Kate" Elizabeth Ann (née Hanlan) McArdle.
 Jane Curtin as Allison "Allie" Julia Charlotte (née Adams) Lowell.
 Ari Meyers as Emma McArdle, Kate's daughter. Meyers left the show a few episodes into the fifth season to attend Yale University (although her name remained in the opening credits to the end of the season); she returned for the season-ending 100th episode retrospective, but did not appear in the sixth season.
 Allison Smith as Jennie Lowell, Allie's daughter of similar age to Emma.
 Frederick Koehler as Charles "Chip" Lowell, Allie's son.
 Sam Freed as Bob Barsky, Allie's boyfriend who became her husband in Season 6. He was a sportscaster after retiring as a professional football player. Freed also played different characters in two separate episodes. In the first season he played a married candidate for office named Johnathan Conti who flirts with Allie. At the end of season three he played Keith in the episode "Late Bloomers", which was a backdoor pilot for a proposed spinoff which would have starred Lindsay Wagner.
 Peter Onorati as Lou Carello, the superintendent in Kate and Allie's new apartment building in Season 6. He tries unsuccessfully to win Kate's affections.

Recurring cast
 Greg Salata as Ted Bartelo, a plumber whom Kate gets involved with during the second season. The two break up in the season two finale. Ted returns for the fifth season, with he and Kate attempting to rekindle their relationship; by the end of this season, he is gone again.
 Paul Hecht as Dr. Charles Lowell, Allie's sometimes pompous ex-husband.
 Harley Venton (previously John Heard) as Max McArdle, Kate's ex-husband.
 Jack Gilpin as Roger, Kate & Allie's next-door neighbor during the series' first two seasons.
 Michael Countryman as Louis, Chip's adult friend who has an intellectual disability.
 Wendie Malick as Claire Lowell, Charles' new wife.
 Alan North as Mr. Sloan, Kate's boss at the travel agency.

Notable guest stars included Ben Stiller, Kelsey Grammer, William H. Macy, Lindsay Wagner, Mercedes Ruehl, Ricki Lake, Dick Cavett, Patricia Richardson, Barbara Barrie, Paul Gleason, Rosemary Murphy, Andrea Martin, John Heard, Debra Jo Rupp, Marilyn Cooper, Susie Essman, Joe Namath, Christa Miller (star Susan St. James' real-life niece), and Peggy Pope.

Spin-offsKate & Allie gave birth to the spin-off Roxie, a short-lived comedy which aired only twice on CBS' schedule, on April 1 and 8, 1987. Roxie starred Andrea Martin as New York City TV programmer Roxie Brinkerhoff, who balanced her professional life at local UHF station WNYV with her married life. Martin had previously appeared as a similar version of the character, named Eddie Gordon, on two episodes of Kate & Allie ("Stage Mother", which aired December 1, 1986, and in "The Goodbye Girl", December 8, 1986), in which she was a friend of Allie's who worked as a producer on low-viewership public-access Channel G.

Another attempted spin-off was Late Bloomer, which was scheduled to be a midseason replacement in January 1987.Gendel, Morgan. "Nichols Developing New ABC Series," Los Angeles Times, Monday, September 22, 1986. Retrieved November 28, 2017 Based on the similarly named Season 3 episode that guest starred Lindsay Wagner, the series was scrapped the day before its January 19, 1987 debut, which was an encore presentation of its backdoor pilot.

Production
The test name for the script was entitled Two Mommies and was seized upon by Saint James who was able to use the show as a way to work without relocating her family from Litchfield, Connecticut. Curtin initially was not interested in doing the sitcom, but after speaking with director Bill Persky she decided to take the role. Kate & Allie was taped on soundstages constructed at the Ed Sullivan Theater (CBS Studio 50) and also at the Teletape Studios at West 81st Street and Broadway in New York City, which at the time was the production facility for Sesame Street.

Cold opening dialog sequences between Saint James and Curtin documenting city life were featured, shot on location in Manhattan with no laugh track. The theme song played instrumentally over the title shot of the Empire State Building (the first season's titles opened in a different outdoor location per episode). Closing credits also included vocals with indicative lyrics, "just when you think/you're all by yourself/you're not."

Under pressure from higher-ups at CBS to quash the suggestion that Kate and Allie were lesbians, the producers were instructed to show Kate and Allie entering separate bedrooms to sleep at the end of each episode. That pressure may have been the impetus for an episode showing Kate and Allie pretending to be lesbians when they were faced with a large increase in rent.

Saint James was pregnant during the taping of the fourth season. Her pregnancy was hidden by taping her behind a desk, under a sheet in a hospital bed, or in a bubble bath. The exception was a 1960s flashback which showed both Kate and Allie pregnant.

An episode broadcast in 1987, produced in cooperation with the Coalition for the Homeless, was taped almost entirely outdoors, on the streets of Manhattan. The episode was prompted by the likely absence of Saint James, who had been hospitalized due to kidney stones, and featured Allie struggling to find a way home after accidentally leaving her keys and money in a taxi.

The show's final season had been picked up with a number of other returning CBS shows for midseason premieres. The lack of inclusion on CBS' 1989–90 fall schedule announced on May 19, 1989, officially ended the series' run.

Ratings
Following are the Nielsen ratings for the show:

 1983–1984: #8
 1984–1985: #17
 1985–1986: #14
 1986–1987: #19
 1987–1988: #38
 1988–1989: #48
According to an essay by Christine R. Catron from the Museum of Broadcast Communications's Encyclopedia of Television, the decline in ratings for the show's last season is attributable to the fact that the show's premise had been fulfilled at the end of the previous season, when Allie accepted Bob Barsky's marriage proposal.

Syndication
The American syndication rights are held by NBCUniversal Television Distribution; the show aired on RTN. Kate & Allie previously aired on WE tv, from 2007 to 2008. FremantleMedia owns the international rights, as they own Thames Television and have access to the Reeves Entertainment product.

Reboot
In January 2021, it was announced that NBC had given a put pilot commitment to a reboot of the series. It will be produced by Fierce Baby Production, Propagate, and Universal Television with Erica Oyama writing and co-executive producing with Nahnatchka Khan, Ben Silverman, Howard T. Owens, Rodney Ferrell, Gregory Lipstone, Peter Principato, Jen Carreras, and Brian Dobbins.

Home media
United States
Universal Studios Home Entertainment released the first season of Kate & Allie on DVD exclusively in the United States in May 2006.

Canada
For the Canadian market, Visual Entertainment (under license from FremantleMedia), has released all six seasons on DVD.  On May 4, 2010, VEI released Kate & Allie: The Complete Series'', a 16-disc boxset featuring all 122 episodes of the series.

References

External links 

 
 

1984 American television series debuts
1989 American television series endings
1980s American sitcoms
CBS original programming
English-language television shows
Primetime Emmy Award-winning television series
Television duos
Television series about families
Television series by Alan Landsburg Productions
Television shows filmed in New York City
Television shows set in New York City